The Democratic Progressive Party was a political party in the South African bantustan of Transkei. The party condemned apartheid rule. In the 1981 elections, the party won one out of 75 seats. In the 1986 elections it won two seats.

References

Anti-Apartheid organisations
Defunct political parties in South Africa
Political parties with year of disestablishment missing
Political parties with year of establishment missing
Politics of Transkei